Garsias de La Mothe or Garsias II. de La Mothe (died 1473) was a Roman Catholic prelate who served as Bishop of Oloron (1465–1473).

Biography
On 24 July 1465, Garsias de La Mothe was appointed during the papacy of Pope Paul II as Bishop of Oloron. On 18 August 1465, he was consecrated bishop by Guillaume d'Estouteville, Cardinal-Bishop of Ostia e Velletri, with Philippe de Lévis, Archbishop of Arles, and Michael Anglicus, Bishop of Carpentras, serving as co-consecrators. He served as Bishop of Oloron until his death in 1473.

References

15th-century French Roman Catholic bishops
Bishops appointed by Pope Paul II
1473 deaths